Events in the year 1998 in Eritrea.

Incumbents 

 President: Isaias Afewerki

Events 

 26 June – United Nations Security Council resolution 1177 was adopted unanimously and condemned the outbreak of war between the country and Ethiopia and demanded an immediate ceasefire in their border dispute.

Deaths

References 

 
1990s in Eritrea
Years of the 20th century in Eritrea
Eritrea
Eritrea